Kanchan is a former Indian actress and model. She has appeared in Hindi, Telugu, and Malayalam films, primarily in the 1990s.

Career
Kanchan acted in several films, including the Salman Khan super hit, Sanam Bewafa (1991). She was then seen with Mohanlal in Gandharvam (1993) and worked alongside Ajith Kumar's debut film Prema Pustakam. Her appearance in many Hindi films did not help her career much.

Kanchan's hit movies are Sanam Bewafa and Gandharvam. She co-starred with Akshay Kumar in Amanaat. She also starred in Coolie No.1 opposite Govinda, Karisma Kapoor and Harish Kumar.

Filmography

Awards
 She won Nandi Special Jury Award for Best Performance in Prema Pusthakam film (1993).

References

External links
 

Year of birth missing (living people)
Living people
Actresses in Hindi cinema
Actresses in Telugu cinema
Actresses in Tamil cinema
Indian film actresses
Actresses in Malayalam cinema
20th-century Indian actresses
21st-century Indian actresses
Actresses from Mumbai